Ernest Norton may refer to:

 Ernest Norton (cricketer) (1889–1972), English cricketer
 Ernest Norton (RAF officer) (1893–1966), British World War I flying ace